Jim Grabb and Richey Reneberg were the defending champions, but lost in the quarterfinals to Luke Jensen and Murphy Jensen.

Scott Davis and Jacco Eltingh won the title by defeating Patrick McEnroe and Jonathan Stark 6–1, 4–6, 7–5 in the final.

Seeds

Draw

Draw

References

External links
 Official results archive (ATP)
 Official results archive (ITF)

Doubles